George Downer Airport  is a city-owned, public-use airport located two nautical miles (4 km) southwest of the central business district of Aliceville, a city in Pickens County, Alabama, United States. 

This airport is included in the FAA's National Plan of Integrated Airport Systems for 2011–2015 and 2009–2013, both of which categorized it as a general aviation facility.

Facilities and aircraft 
George Downer Airport covers an area of 41 acres (17 ha) at an elevation of 150 feet (46 m) above mean sea level. It has one runway designated 6/24 with an asphalt surface measuring 4,970 by 80 feet (1,515 x 24 m). For the 12-month period ending July 26, 2006, the airport had 5,400 general aviation aircraft operations, an average of 14 per day.

See also 
 List of airports in Alabama

References

External links 
 Aerial image as of 1 February 1992 from USGS The National Map

Airports in Alabama
Transportation buildings and structures in Pickens County, Alabama